The 1999–2000 Australian Athletics Championships was the 78th edition of the national championship in outdoor track and field for Australia. It was held from 24 to 27 February 2000 at the Stadium Australia in Sydney. It served as a selection meeting for Australia at the 2000 Summer Olympics. The 10,000 metres events took place separately at the Melbourne Track Classic on 2 March 2000 in Melbourne.

The competition was also a preparation event for the athletics at the 2000 Summer Olympics, which were held at the same venue.

Medal summary

Men

Women

References

External links 
 Athletics Australia website

2000
Australian Athletics Championships
Australian Championships
Athletics Championships
Sports competitions in Sydney
2000s in Sydney